"Fútbol y Rumba" is a song by Puerto Rican rapper Anuel AA, featuring vocals from Spanish singer Enrique Iglesias and was released on May 29, 2020, as the third single from his second studio album Emmanuel.

Music video
The video was released on May 29, 2020. It showcases celebrities such as Shaquille O'Neal, J Balvin, and Marshmello, as well as soccer stars such as Lionel Messi, Sergio Ramos, and Luis Suárez doing various activities while being quarantined due to the COVID-19 pandemic.

Charts

Weekly charts

Year-end charts

Certifications

See also
List of Billboard Hot Latin Songs and Latin Airplay number ones of 2020

References

2020 singles
2020 songs
Anuel AA songs
Enrique Iglesias songs
Songs written by Anuel AA
Songs written by Enrique Iglesias
Spanish-language songs